Udaka may refer:
Uddaka Rāmaputta, teacher of Gautama Buddha.
Shinji Udaka, a Japanese Baseball player.
Udakanuketiya, a town in Sri Lanka.
Udaka vadya, an Indian musical instrument.